The Colgate Raiders women’s basketball team is the college basketball program representing Colgate University in Hamilton, New York. The Raiders currently participate as part of the NCAA Division I basketball, and compete in the Patriot League. The Raiders currently play their home games at the Cotterell Court.

History
They joined the Patriot League in 1990. They were previously in the MECA for the 1986–87 season and the All-North Atlantic Conference for the 1989–90 season. They have made one NCAA Tournament appearance, losing to Tennessee 77–54 in the First Round in 2004.

Postseason appearances
The Raiders have made the NCAA Division I women's basketball tournament once. They are 0–1 in NCAA Tournament appearances.

References

External links